Rockin' and Romance is the fifth album by American rock band Jonathan Richman and the Modern Lovers, released in 1985 as part of a two-album deal for Richman with Geoff Travis's Rough Trade Records label in the UK. Originally planned for release in the U.S. by Sire Records, it was issued there by Twin/Tone Records.

Track listing
All songs written by Jonathan Richman.

Side one
"The Beach" – 2:19
"My Jeans" – 3:17
"Down in Bermuda" – 3:04
"The U.F.O. Man" – 3:22
"I Must Be King" – 2:40
"Vincent van Gogh" – 2:25
"Walter Johnson" – 2:21

Side two
"I'm Just Beginning to Live" – 2:53
"The Fenway" – 2:30
"Chewing Gum Wrapper" – 3:21
"The Baltimores" – 3:01
"Up in the Sky Sometime" – 2:52
"Now Is Better Than Before" – 2:17

Personnel
Jonathan Richman – vocals, guitars
Ellie Marshall – first female singer
Debbie Edwards – additional female singer
Jeanette Sartain – additional female singer
Michael Guardabascio – male singer, drums
Ned Claflin – male singer
Tom Nelson – male singer
Scot Woodland – male singer
Andy Paley – male singer, drum solo on "I'm Just Beginning to Live", toy piano

Technical
Andy Paley – producer
Carol Fondé – cover photo

References

1985 albums
Jonathan Richman albums
Rough Trade Records albums
Twin/Tone Records albums
Albums produced by Andy Paley